Calvary Cemetery may refer to:

French Polynesia 
 Calvary Cemetery (Atuona)

United States 

 Calvary Cemetery (Los Angeles), California
 Calvary Cemetery (Evanston, Illinois)
 Calvary Cemetery (South Portland, Maine)
 Calvary Cemetery (St. Louis), Missouri
 Calvary Cemetery (Queens), New York
 Calvary Cemetery (Cleveland), Ohio
 Calvary Cemetery (Youngstown, Ohio)
 Calvary Catholic Cemetery (Enid, Oklahoma)
 Calvary Catholic Cemetery (Pittsburgh), Pennsylvania
 Calvary Cemetery (Seattle), Washington
 Calvary Cemetery (Tacoma, Washington)
 Calvary Cemetery (Milwaukee), Wisconsin

See also 
 Mount Calvary Cemetery (disambiguation)